The Inter-Allied Rhineland High Commission was created by the Treaty of Versailles on 28 June 1919, to supervise the occupation of the Rhineland and "ensure, by any means, the security and satisfaction of all the needs of the Armies of Occupation". It came into being on 10 January 1920, when the treaty came into force. It was based in Coblenz.

Members of the High Commission

Chairman of the Inter-Allied Rhineland High Commission (in Coblenz)
1919 - 1930 Paul Tirard (France)
High Commissioners:
 Pierrepont Noyes (United States) (1919 - May 1920)
 Henry Tureman Allen (United States) (May 1920 - 24 January 1923)
 Professor Rolin Jacquemyns (Belgium)
 Sir Harold Stuart (Britain) (1919 - 16 December 1920)
 Victor Hay, 21st Earl of Erroll (Britain) (16 December 1920 - May 1928)
 William Seeds (Britain) (May 1928 - 12 December 1929)

Non Voting co-optee
 Karl von Starck (1919 - 1921)
 Prince Hermann von Hatzfeldt-Wildenburg (1921 - 1923)
Chairman of the Inter-Allied Military Control Commission (For Germany, after 1922)
 1919 - 1924 Charles Marie Edouard Nollet (France)
 1924 - 1927 Camille Welch (France)

Legal instrument of the Commission

Part XIV, Section i of the Treaty of Versailles stipulated:

Article 428
As a guarantee for the execution of the present Treaty by Germany, the German territory situated to the west of the Rhine, together with the bridgeheads, will be occupied by Allied and Associated troops for a period of fifteen years from the coming into force of the present Treaty.

Article 429
If the conditions of the present Treaty are faithfully carried out by Germany, the occupation referred to in Article 428 will be successively restricted as follows:

(i) At the expiration of five years there will be evacuated: the bridgehead of Cologne and the territories north of a line running along the Ruhr, then along the railway Jülich, Duren, Euskirchen, Rheinbach, thence along the road Rheinbach to Sinzig, and reaching the Rhine at the confluence with the Ahr; the roads, railways and places mentioned above being excluded from the area evacuated.

(ii) At the expiration of ten years there will be evacuated: the bridgehead of Coblenz and the territories north of a line to be drawn from the intersection between the frontiers of Belgium, Germany and Holland, running about from 4 kilometres south of Aix-la-Chapelle, then to and following the crest of Forst Gemünd, then east of the railway of the Urft valley, then along Blankenheim, Waldorf, Dreis, Ulmen to and following the Moselle from Bremm to Nehren, then passing by Kappel and Simmern, then following the ridge of the heights between Simmern and the Rhine and reaching this river at Bacharach; all the places valleys, roads and railways mentioned above being excluded from the area evacuated.

(iii) At the expiration of fifteen years there will be evacuated: the bridgehead of Mainz, the bridgehead of Kehl and the remainder of the German territory under occupation.

If at that date the guarantees against unprovoked aggression by Germany are not considered sufficient by the Allied and Associated Governments, the evacuation of the occupying troops may be delayed to the extent regarded as necessary for the purpose of obtaining the required guarantees.

Article 430
In case either during the occupation or after the expiration of the fifteen years referred to above the Reparation Commission finds that Germany refuses to observe the whole or part of her obligations under the present Treaty with regard to reparation, the whole or part of the areas specified in Article 429 will be reoccupied immediately by the Allied and Associated forces.

Article 431
If before the expiration of the period of fifteen years Germany complies with all the undertakings resulting from the present Treaty, the occupying forces will be withdrawn immediately.

See also
 Occupation of the Ruhr
 British Summary Court
 Military Inter-Allied Commission of Control

References

Bibliography

 
1920 establishments in Germany
1929 disestablishments in Germany
20th century in international relations
Aftermath of World War I in Germany
American military occupations
Belgian military occupations
British military occupations
Foreign relations of the Weimar Republic
French military occupations
History of the Rhineland
1920s in Germany
Military history of Germany
Organisations based in Koblenz
Organizations established in 1920
Organizations disestablished in 1929